Boris Omer Dallo (born 12 March 1994) is a French professional basketball player for Cholet Basket of the LNB Pro A. He can play at both guard positions.

Early life and youth career
Dallo was born in Nantes on 12 March 1994. He began his youth club career at the age of five, playing for Hermine Nantes, before making the move to INSEP academy when he was 15, from 2009 to 2012.

Professional career
Dallo attended the National Institute of Sport and Physical Education (INSEP).

Poitiers (2012–2013)
Dallo signed a two-year deal with Poitiers Basket 86 of the LNB Pro A. He made his professional debut in the 2012–13 season.

KK Partizan (2013–2015)
In August 2013, Dallo signed a four-year contract with the Serbian club Partizan Belgrade. In his first season with Partizan, he won the Basketball League of Serbia defeating Crvena zvezda with 3-1 in the final series. After the end of the 2014–15 season, he parted ways with Partizan.

2015–2017
In July 2015, Dallo returned to France, and signed a two-year deal with Olympique Antibes.

On 1 November 2016, Dallo was acquired by the Long Island Nets of the NBA Development League.

Panionios (2017–2018)
On 16 October 2017, Dallo joined Panionios in the Greek Basket League. In 22 games he finished the 2017-2018 season averaging 7.5 points, 7.3 rebounds, 3,2 assists and 12,3 index in 27 minutes. He was the third best rebounder of the league and the top rebounder of his team.

Aris (2018–2019)
On 28 June 2018, Dallo joined Aris in the Greek Basket League.

SIG Strasbourg (2019–2020)
On 5 August 2019 he signed with SIG Strasbourg of the Pro A.

Le Portel (2020–2021)
On 28 May 2020 he signed with ESSM Le Portel of the LNB Pro A.

Cholet Basket (2021–present)
On 31 August 2021 he signed with Cholet Basket of the LNB Pro A.

National team career
Dallo represents France internationally. He was selected for the U16 Eurobasket in 2009 and 2010, for the U18 Eurobasket in 2011 and 2012, and for the U20 Eurobasket in 2013 and 2014.

References

External links
 Boris Dallo at aba-liga.com
 Boris Dallo at draftexpress.com
 Boris Dallo at fiba.com
 Boris Dallo at euroleague.net
 Boris Dallo at lnb.fr

1994 births
Living people
ABA League players
Aris B.C. players
Black French sportspeople
Cholet Basket players
French expatriate basketball people in Serbia
French expatriate basketball people in the United States
French men's basketball players
KK Partizan players
Long Island Nets players
Olympique Antibes basketball players
Panionios B.C. players
Point guards
Poitiers Basket 86 players
Shooting guards
SIG Basket players
SLUC Nancy Basket players
Sportspeople from Nantes